With Every Heartbeat, also released as Kiss Me, is a 2011 Swedish drama film directed by Alexandra-Therese Keining. The film won the "Breakthrough Award" at the 2011 AFI Festival.

Synopsis
Mia (Ruth Vega Fernandez) announces her engagement to her boyfriend Tim (Joakim Natterqvist) at her father's 60th birthday party. At the same party, her father Lasse (Krister Henriksson), proposes to his live-in girlfriend Elizabeth (Lena Endre).

When Mia meets Elizabeth's fun-loving daughter Frida (Liv Mjönes), she is initially wary of being accepted into Elizabeth's family. Reluctantly, Mia agrees to a weekend getaway on the island of Fyn with Frida and Elizabeth. Forced to share a bedroom with Frida, Mia finds herself fascinated by the other woman's free-spiritedness. While out walking in the woods one night, Mia kisses Frida. Frida is ready and willing to reciprocate, and the women soon have sex for the first time. However, the weekend over, Mia must return to Stockholm and her life with Tim, and Frida to her life partner Elin (Josefine Tengblad).

Mia asks Frida to run away with her to Spain, but Frida reminds her of her upcoming wedding to Tim. Frida breaks up with Elin, and Mia backs out of the wedding. Frida runs away, deciding on Spain as a destination. Mia attempts to find her by asking Elin, who refuses to tell her, and then Elisabeth, who tells her that Frida’s flight departs soon. She rushes to the airport but misses Frida’s flight. Mia goes on to Spain where she and Frida share a happy reunion.

Cast
 Ruth Vega Fernandez as Mia
 Liv Mjönes as Frida
 Krister Henriksson as Lasse
 Lena Endre as Elisabeth
 Joakim Nätterqvist as Tim
 Tom Ljungman as Oskar
  as Elin

Music
The music for this film includes original scores arranged by Marc Collin, as well as an eclectic mix of songs from various artists including José González and Kultiration and Swedish pop icon, Robyn.

See also 
 List of LGBT films directed by women

References

External links
  Kyss mig / Kiss Me at Lebox Produktion
  Kyss mig / Kiss Me / With Every Heartbeat Press Kit
  Kyss mig at BFI
 
  Kyss mig at Lumiere
 

2011 films
2011 romantic drama films
2011 LGBT-related films
Lesbian-related films
LGBT-related romantic drama films
Swedish romantic drama films
Swedish LGBT-related films
Films about infidelity
2010s Swedish-language films
2010s Swedish films